The 14th New Brunswick Legislative Assembly represented New Brunswick between January 28, 1847, and May 31, 1850.

The assembly sat at the pleasure of the Governor of New Brunswick William MacBean George Colebrooke. Edmund Walker Head became governor in April 1848.

In May 1848, the governor formed what has been described as the first "responsible government" in the province, bringing more balanced representation of the members of the assembly into the Executive Council and giving more decision-making power to the council.

John Wesley Weldon was chosen as speaker for the house.

List of members

Notes:

References
Journal of the House of Assembly of ... New Brunswick from ... January to ... April, 1847 ... (1847)

Terms of the New Brunswick Legislature
1850 in Canada
1847 in Canada
1848 in Canada
1849 in Canada
1847 establishments in New Brunswick
1850 disestablishments in New Brunswick